Di'Jonn Grizzell, (born August 29, 1989) better known by his stage name Jonn Hart, is an American singer, rapper from Oakland, California. He is a former member of the band Tha Outfit and was formerly signed to Epic Records. His debut release, "Who Booty", has been in regular rotation on radio stations, peaked at #3 on the Rhythmic Songs chart, and debuted on the Billboard Top 40 Pop Songs chart in February 2013 and December 2012, respectively.

Life and career
Hart grew up in a musical family. His mother sang in choir and his stepfather was involved in gospel music and owned his own studio. In an interview with XXL Magazine, Hart stated that he used to visit the studio as a kid and realized at a very young age that he wanted to be involved with music. He began his career with the R&B boy band Tha Outfit.

He pursued a solo career in 2012 and released the song "Who Booty", featuring Iamsu! on the original version, and a remix version featuring French Montana and another featuring E-40. He graduated James Logan High School and continued his education at Morehouse College in Atlanta.

In December 2013, Hart released a single titled "I Can't Feel My Legs", which featured YMCMB singer, songwriter, choreographer and video director Shanell on the assist.

Discography

Albums
 Straight From the Hart (2017)

Mixtapes
 Heart 2 Hart (2013)
 Heart 2 Hart 2 (2014)
 Heart 2 Hart 3 (2015)
 Cross My Hart  (2018)
 Cross My Hart 2 (2019)

Extended plays

Singles

References

External links
 Official Website of Jonn Hart
 The Grio Interview with Jonn Hart

Epic Records artists
American rhythm and blues musicians
1989 births
Living people